Electronic Games was the first dedicated video game magazine published in the United States and ran from October 15, 1981 to 1997 under different titles. It was co-founded by Bill Kunkel, Joyce Worley, and Arnie Katz..

History 

The history of Electronic Games originates in the consumer electronics magazine, Video. Initially video games were covered sporadic in Deeny Kaplan's regular "VideoTest Reports" column. In the summer of 1979, Video decided to launch a new column to focus on video games. Arcade Alley became a regular column and would represent a journalistic first. Written by Bill Kunkel, Arnie Katz (initially pseudonymously writing as Frank T. Laney II), and Joyce Worley, the three writers became close friends and in 1981 they founded Electronic Games magazine. The magazine was active from Winter 1981, during the golden age of arcade video games and the second generation of consoles, up until 1985, following the video game crash of 1983. The magazine was briefly revived during the 16-bit era in the early 1990s, but ended in 1995 and was renamed to Fusion.

Initially, the release of the first issue was scheduled for October 15, 1981. However, the release was postponed to October 29, 1981 and featured a slightly different cover than initially advertised.

1st Run

2nd Run

Arcade Awards 
Electronic Games is notable for hosting the Arcade Awards, or Arkie Awards, the first "Game of the Year" award ceremony simultaneously running in Videos "Arcade Alley" column. The following games are the winners of the magazine's annual Arcade Awards. The awards for each year took place in the January of the following year. No single game was allowed to win more than one award in the same year.

1980 Arcade Awards (1979) 
According to the Winter 1981 issue of Electronic Games, the 1980 Arcade Awards (i.e., the first set of "Arkies") were announced in February 1980 and covered all hardware and software produced prior to January 1, 1980.

1981 Arcade Awards (1980) 
The 1981 edition of the awards reflects accomplishments during the 12 months of the preceding year.

1982 Arcade Awards (1981) 
The third annual Arcade Awards were sponsored jointly by Video and Electronic Games and honored outstanding achievements in the field of
video games of the year 1981. The 1982 Arcade Awards were published in the March 1982 issue of Electronic Games.

1983 Arcade Awards (1982) 
The 4th "Arkies" cover games published between October 1, 1981 and October 1, 1982 and were published in the January 1983 issue of Electronic Games.

1984 Arcade Awards (1983) 
The 5th "Arkies" were published in the January 1984 issue of Electronic Games.

1985 Arkie Awards (1984) 
The 6th "Arkies" were printed in the January 1985 issue of Electronic Games.

1992 (7th)
Following the magazine's revival in 1992, it published the Electronic Gaming Awards in March 1993, where editors nominated several games for each category and the readers would vote which games win. The following were the winners and nominees for 1992.

1993 (8th)
The following games were the winners and nominees for the EG Awards of 1993, with nominees chosen by editors and winners voted by readers.

Reader polls
From May 1982 onwards, the magazine carried out a reader poll in each issue to see which are the most popular games of the month among its readers, up until the January 1985 issue. The top-ranking games in these polls are listed below.

1982
May
 Console: Asteroids  (Runner-Up: Missile Command)
 Computer: Star Raiders (Runner-Up: Space Invaders)
 Arcade: Pac-Man (Runner-Up: Asteroids)

August
 Console: Pac-Man (Runner-Up: Missile Command)
 Computer: Star Raiders (Runner-Up: Jawbreaker)
 Arcade: Pac-Man (Runner-Up: Tempest)

September
 Console: Pac-Man (Runner-Up: Missile Command)
 Computer: Star Raiders (Runner-Up: Missile Command)
 Arcade: Pac-Man (Runner-Up: Donkey Kong)

October & November
 Console: Defender (Runner-Up: Pac-Man)
 Computer: Star Raiders (Runner-Up: Missile Command)
 Arcade: Tempest (Runner-Up: Donkey Kong)

The games that were top-ranked the most in these 1982 polls were:
 Console: Pac-Man (Runner-Up: Defender)
 Computer: Star Raiders (Runner-Up: Missile Command)
 Arcade: Pac-Man (Runner-Up: Tempest)

1983
January
 Console: Pitfall! (Runner-Up: Berzerk)
 Computer: Star Raiders (Runner-Up: Pac-Man)
 Arcade: Donkey Kong (Runner-Up: Dig Dug)

May
 Console: Pitfall! (Runner-Up: Donkey Kong)
 Computer: Star Raiders (Runner-Up: Pac-Man)
 Arcade: Donkey Kong

June
 Console: Donkey Kong (Runner-Up: Zaxxon)
 Computer: Star Raiders (Runner-Up: Pac-Man)
 Arcade: Donkey Kong (Runner-Up: Tron)

July
 Console: Pitfall! (Runner-Up: Donkey Kong)
 Computer: Star Raiders (Runner-Up: Pac-Man)
 Arcade: Donkey Kong (Runner-Up: Donkey Kong Jr.)

August
 Console: Donkey Kong (Runner-Up: Pitfall!)
 Computer: Pac-Man (Runner-Up: Star Raiders)
 Arcade: Zaxxon (Runner-Up: Joust)

September
 Console: Donkey Kong Jr. (Runner-Up: Lady Bug)
 Computer: Star Raiders (Runner-Up: Centipede)
 Arcade: Pole Position (Runner-Up: Donkey Kong Jr.)

October
 Console: Donkey Kong (Runner-Up: River Raid)
 Computer: Star Raiders (Runner-Up: Pac-Man)
 Arcade: Pole Position (Runner-Up: Donkey Kong)

November
 Console: Donkey Kong Jr. (Runner-Up: Zaxxon)
 Computer: Star Raiders (Runner-Up: Pac-Man)
 Arcade: Pole Position (Runner-Up: Q*bert)

December
 Console: Donkey Kong Jr. (Runner-Up: Centipede)
 Computer: Miner 2049er (Runner-Up: Star Raiders)
 Arcade: Pole Position (Runner-Up: Q*bert)

The games that were top-ranked the most in these 1983 polls were:
 Console: Donkey Kong / Donkey Kong Jr.
 Computer: Star Raiders (Runner-Up: Pac-Man)
 Arcade: Pole Position (Runner-Up: Donkey Kong)

1984
January
 Console: Donkey Kong Jr. (Runner-Up: River Raid)
 Computer: Miner 2049er (Runner-Up: Star Raiders)
 Arcade: Dragon's Lair (Runner-Up: Star Wars)

November
 Console: Pitfall II (Runner-Up: Miner 2049er)
 Computer: Zork I (Runner-Up: Buck Rogers)
 Arcade: Dragon's Lair (Runner-Up: Star Wars)

December
 Computer: Zork I
 Arcade: Spy Hunter (Runner-Up: Track & Field)

The games that were top-ranked the most in these 1984 polls were:
 Console: Donkey Kong Jr. / Pitfall II
 Computer: Zork I (Runner-Up: Miner 2049er)
 Arcade: Dragon's Lair (Runner-Up: Spy Hunter)

1985
January
 Console: Pitfall II (Runner-Up: Q*bert)
 Computer: Miner 2049er (Runner-Up: Donkey Kong)
 Arcade: Star Wars (Runner-Up: Dragon's Lair)

There was no reader poll held for the March 1985 issue.

Hall of Fame
The twelve games voted by readers as part of the magazine's Hall of Fame up until January 1985.
 Pong (1972)
 Space Invaders (1978)
 Asteroids (1979)
 Star Raiders (1979)
 Defender (1980)
 Major League Baseball (1980)
 Pac-Man (1980)
 Donkey Kong (1981)
 Quest for the Rings (1981)
 Miner 2049er (1982)
 Zaxxon (1982)
 Dragon's Lair (1983)

References

External links
 Article on the first issue of Electronic Games
 PDF magazine repository at archive.org
 PDF magazine repository at digitpress.com

Video game magazines published in the United States
Magazines established in 1981
Magazines disestablished in 1994
Defunct computer magazines published in the United States
Magazines published in New York City